Kauste is a village in Hiiumaa Parish, Hiiu County in northwestern Estonia.

The village is first mentioned in 1565 (Kowstha). Historically, the village was part of Kõrgessaare Manor.

1977–1997 the village was part of Malvaste village.

References
 

Villages in Hiiu County